Tropical Park is a census-designated place (CDP) in Brevard County, Florida, United States. It occupies a portion of Merritt Island, a barrier island, and is surrounded by the CDP of Merritt Island. Florida State Road 3 is the main highway in the area, forming the eastern edge of Tropical Park.

Tropical Park was first listed as a CDP prior to the 2020 census.

Demographics

References 

Census-designated places in Brevard County, Florida
Census-designated places in Florida